"Prophecy Girl" is the season finale of the WB Television Network's first season of the drama television series Buffy the Vampire Slayer, and the 12th episode of the series. It first aired on June 2, 1997. Series creator Joss Whedon wrote and directed the episode.

The narrative features vampire Slayer Buffy Summers (Sarah Michelle Gellar) working to prevent vampire the Master (Mark Metcalf) from rising to power, despite a prophecy predicting her death at his hands.

Due to the first season of the show acting as a midseason replacement for Savannah, all twelve episodes were produced before the first episode aired (and as such, the conclusion of the episode serves to wrap the series up in case it were not renewed). All following seasons ran from September to May and received twenty-two episode pick-ups.

Plot
Reading a book of prophecies that Angel gave him, Giles learns that the Master is destined to rise the next day and that Buffy will die. An earthquake is felt all over town. The next morning, Buffy meets Giles in the library, the balcony of which has sustained significant damage from the earthquake. Buffy reports that the vampires are rising in number and getting braver.

Jenny Calendar interrupts Giles' study in the library to warn him that she sees apocalyptic portents. She tells him that Brother Luca, a monk in Cortona, is e-mailing her about the Anointed One. Giles asks her to get more information about this, promising he will explain everything later. Xander asks out Buffy to the dance despite knowing she likes Angel, but she turns him down. He asks out Willow as a rebound, but she turns him down too.

That evening, Buffy uses the restroom at school and finds that the faucet is running with blood. As Buffy enters the library she hears Giles telling Angel about the prophecy. Buffy, shocked, yells that she is quitting as the Slayer, throwing the cross Angel gave her on the ground. She goes back home and tries to persuade her mother to go away with her for the weekend; Joyce tells her how she met Buffy's father and instead gives her a white evening gown to go to the dance in.

The next day, Cordelia and Willow find the AV club slaughtered by vampires. Buffy, having heard, shows up in her evening gown at Willow's house; Willow expresses fear of their world being taken over by the vampires. Buffy goes back to the library, where Giles has explained to Jenny that Buffy is the Slayer. Giles decides to face the Master himself, instead of Buffy. Buffy reinstates herself as the Slayer, knocks Giles out when he tries to stop her and goes to kill the Master. Outside of school, Collin leads her to the Master's lair.

Willow and Xander show up at the library, where they hear that Buffy has gone off to see the Master. Xander goes to Angel's apartment where he forces Angel to lead him to the Master's lair and help Buffy. The Master tells Buffy that it is her blood which will free him. He drinks from her and leaves her to drown in a shallow pool. Willow and Jenny suspect that the Hellmouth is underneath the Bronze and leave to warn the students there, but are surrounded by vampires. Cordelia rescues them in her car and drives it straight into the library. Xander finds Buffy and resuscitates her with CPR.

As Cordelia, Willow, Giles and Jenny fight off vampires trying to enter the library, a three-headed creature smashes through the floor, revealing that the Hellmouth is directly underneath the library itself. Buffy, now on the roof, tosses the Master down into the library, where he is impaled on broken furniture. He partly dusts, leaving only his skeleton. The world goes back to normal and everyone goes to the Bronze.

Broadcast and reception
"Prophecy Girl" was first broadcast on The WB on June 2, 1997. It received a Nielsen rating of 2.8 on its initial airing.

Noel Murray of The A.V. Club gave "Prophecy Girl" a grade of A−, describing it as "a sterling example of how to write and direct this show". He particularly praised the quieter moments between the characters, and listed "the story feeling a little compressed" as his main qualm. Emily VanDerWerff, also of The A.V. Club listed "Prophecy Girl" as one of the "10 episodes that show how Buffy The Vampire Slayer blew up genre TV", writing that it gave "a sense of the series at its early best". DVD Talk's Phillip Duncan described the episode as "a neat and tidy close without much fanfare" and felt that there was "too much crammed into this episode as several plot-points are struggled to be resolved". On the other hand, a review from the BBC called it "a very satisfying conclusion", highlighting the tone and the performances. Jarett Wieselman of the New York Post listed the scene where Buffy says she quits being the Slayer as one of the top five moments of Gellar as Buffy. Joss Whedon named "Prophecy Girl" as his tenth favorite episode.

References

External links

 

Buffy the Vampire Slayer (season 1) episodes
1997 American television episodes
Television episodes directed by Joss Whedon
Television episodes written by Joss Whedon
Television episodes about precognition
Apocalyptic television episodes

it:Episodi di Buffy l'ammazzavampiri (prima stagione)#La riunione